Azizul Haque, meaning "strong in the truth", is a male Muslim given name. Notable bearers of the name include:

Qazi Azizul Haque (1872–1935), also Khan Bahadur Qazi Azizul Huq, Quazi Syed Azizul Haque, police officer and fingerprint pioneer in British India
Azizul Haque (educator), (1892–1947), also known as Muhammad Azizul Huq or Mohammad Azizul Huque, Bengali lawyer, writer and public servant
Azizul Haq, also known as Qutub-e-Zaman Mufti Azizul Haq, Islamic scholar from Bangladesh
Azizul Haque (Indian politician) (1916–2018) Indian politician
Azizul Haque (scholar) (1919–2012), widely known as Shaykh ul-Hadith Allamah Azizul Haque, imam and scholar from Bangladesh
Hasan Azizul Huq (1939-2021), Bangladeshi short-story writer and novelist
Azizul Huq Arzu (born 1958), Bangladesh Awami League Member of Parliament 
Azizul Haque Choudhury, Bangladesh Awami League Member of Parliament

Arabic masculine given names
Arabic-language surnames